David III normally refers to David III of Tao.

David III may also refer to:

 David III Strathbogie
 David III, Catholicos-Patriarch of Georgia
 Caucasian Albanian Catholicos David III, see List of Caucasian Albanian Catholicoi